British International School of Wrocław (BISC Wrocław) is a co-educational private school in Wrocław, Poland. The school opened in September 2006 to provide primary and secondary educations for the growing expatriate community. BISC Wroclaw is the sister school of the British International School of Cracow (BISC).

History
From September 2006, the school shared premises with a Polish sports school on ul. Trwała. In January 2009, it moved to its present location on al. Akacjowa 10–12.

Primary section
The primary school section is split between the two villas, with junior classes in the smaller villa and senior classes in the larger. The school has classrooms for each year group along with a dedicated room for English as an Additional Language.

Secondary section
The secondary section is situated in the larger building and has a theatre hall, dining hall, science laboratory and library. In addition to classrooms, there is an ICT suite and a staffroom. The second floor houses more classrooms for the secondary school.

Administration
The School Secretary and Head of School are based on the first floor of the smaller villa. The School Administrator is based on the ground floor of the larger villa.

Curriculum

Key stages 1 - 3
Students in Years 1 through 9 follow the National Curriculum of England which is based on the DFES Guidelines.

Key stage 4
The school offers a mixture of GCSE and iGCSE subjects at Years 10 and 11. Subjects offered include:
Mathematics
English Language and Literature
Biology
Chemistry
Physics
History
Geography
German
Polish
French
Spanish
Art
Music
Information and Communication Technology
Physical Education*
 * non-examined

Alevel
Subjects offered at Advanced Subsidiary (AS) and Advanced Level (A2) include:
Mathematics
English Literature
Human Biology
Chemistry
Physics
History
Geography
Business Studies
Economics
Psychology
German
Polish
French
Spanish
Art and Design

Polish Education
BISC Wrocław also offers education to Polish Citizens through the Polsko-Brytyjska Dwujęzyczna Szkoła Podstawowa (Polish-British Bilingual Elementary School) This is a programme of lessons in accordance with Polish education law.  These are scheduled to ensure students receive a complementary balance of instructions in both the British and Polish systems.

Management

Head of school

Head of secondary
{| class="wikitable"
|-
! Period of Service !! Name
|-September 2007 – August 2008 || Pamela Rigby
| September 2008 – August 2009 || Chris Holliday
|-
| September 2009 – August 2010 || Vincent Keat
|-
| September 2010 – August 2011 || Ben Chell
|-
| September 2011 – August 2015 || Wayne Billington
|-
| September 2015 - August 2019 || Joe Peck
|-
|September 2019 - August 2021 || Agnieszka Peck & Nancy Pliego Blancas (Co-head)
|-
|September 2022 - Present     || Ayobami Peter Oluwafemi Bamgbose

Head of primary

References

External links

BISC Wrocław 
World Wide Schools Directory

Wrocław
International Baccalaureate schools in Poland
Education in Wrocław
Educational institutions established in 2006
International schools in Poland
2006 establishments in Poland